Joynagar Union is an Union Parishad under Kalia Upazila of Narail District in the division of Khulna, Bangladesh. It has an area of 91.92 km2 (35.49 sq mi) and a population of 14,092.

Villages 
 Gachbaria
 Nayanpur
 Rampura
 Joynagar
 Dulalgati
 Naragati
 Dumoria
 Kamsia
 Tebaria
 Debdun
 Paduma
 Panipara
 Keshabpur
 Bhaurirchar
 Gharibhanga
 Char Shuktail
 Char Ghenashur

References

Unions of Kalia Upazila
Unions of Narail District
Unions of Khulna Division